The Shorland Medal is awarded annually by the New Zealand Association of Scientists in recognition of a "major and continued contribution to basic or applied research that has added significantly to scientific understanding or resulted in significant benefits to society." The medal was established in 1999 and named after Brian Shorland, a New Zealand organic chemist.

Recipients

References

External links 

 Shorland Medal, New Zealand Association of Scientists

New Zealand science and technology awards
Awards established in 1999
1999 establishments in New Zealand